Almas de vagar (Wandering of soul in English), is the second book by the Uruguayan Horacio López Usera, published in 2009.

Review 
The book is an independent edition; a travel book, which features stories "de mochila a la espalda" (backpack) and reflect the journey of former basketball player in places like Southeast Asia, Central America and various corners of Uruguay.

References 

2009 non-fiction books
Spanish books
Travel books
Uruguayan non-fiction books
Spanish-language books